is a Japanese professional footballer who plays as a defensive midfielder for J.League club Júbilo Iwata.

Club statistics

References

External links

Profile at Júbilo Iwata

1996 births
Living people
Association football people from Shizuoka Prefecture
Japanese footballers
J1 League players
J2 League players
J3 League players
Júbilo Iwata players
J.League U-22 Selection players
Vegalta Sendai players
Association football midfielders